The Temple of Jupiter in Damascus was built by the Romans, beginning during the rule of Augustus and completed during the rule of Constantius II.

History

Aramaean temple of Hadad-Ramman
Damascus was the capital of the Aramaean state Aram-Damascus during the Iron Age. The Arameans of western Syria followed the cult of Hadad-Ramman, the god of thunderstorms and rain, and erected a temple dedicated to him at the site of the present-day Umayyad Mosque. It is not known exactly how the temple looked, but it is believed to have followed the traditional Semitic-Canaanite architectural form, resembling the Temple of Jerusalem. The site likely consisted of a walled courtyard, a small chamber for worship, and a tower-like structure typically symbolizing the "high place" of storm gods, in this case Hadad. One stone remains from the Aramaean temple, dated to the rule of King Hazael, is currently on display in the National Museum of Damascus.

Roman temple of Jupiter
The Temple of Hadad-Ramman continued to serve a central role in the city, and when the Romans conquered Damascus in 64 BCE they assimilated Hadad with their own god of thunder, Jupiter. Thus, they engaged in a project to reconfigure and expand the temple under the direction of Damascus-born architect Apollodorus, who created and executed the new design. The symmetry and dimensions of the new Greco-Roman Temple of Jupiter impressed the local population. With the exception of the much increased scale of the building, most of its original Semitic design was preserved; the walled courtyard was largely left intact. In the center of the courtyard stood the cella, an image of the god which followers would honor. There was one tower at each of courtyard's four corners. The towers were used for rituals in line with ancient Semitic religious traditions where sacrifices were made on high places.

The sheer size of the compound suggests that the religious hierarchy of the temple, sponsored by the Romans, wielded major influence in the city's affairs. The Roman temple, which later became the center of the Imperial cult of Jupiter, was intended to serve as a response to the Jewish temple in Jerusalem. Instead of being dedicated to one god, the Roman temple combined (interpretatio graeca) all of the gods affiliated with heaven that were worshipped in the region such as Hadad, Ba'al-Shamin and Dushara, into the "supreme-heavenly-astral Zeus". The Temple of Jupiter would attain further additions during the early period of Roman rule of the city, mostly initiated by high priests who collected contributions from the wealthy citizens of Damascus. The inner court, or temenos is believed to have been completed soon after the end of Augustus' reign in 14CE. This was surrounded by an outer court, or peribolos which included a market, and was built in stages as funds permitted, and completed in the middle of the first century CE. At this time the eastern gateway or propylaeum was first built. This main gateway was later expanded during the reign of Septimius Severus (r. 193–211 CE).

By the 4th century CE, the temple was especially renowned for its size and beauty. It was separated from the city by two sets of walls. The first, wider wall spanned a wide area that included a market, and the second wall surrounded the actual sanctuary of Jupiter. It was the largest temple in Roman Syria.

Later history
During the Persecution of pagans in the late Roman Empire, Theodosius I converted the temple to a church dedicated to John the Baptist.  After the Muslims took over Damascus in 635 CE, the church was shared for seventy years, but Al-Walid I converted it to the Umayyad Mosque.

Archaeology and interpretation
Richard Pococke published a plan of the temple compound in 1745 in his work A Description of the East and Some other Countries, Vol. II. In 1855, the Reverend Josias Porter published a plan showing 40 surviving columns or column fragments which still survived between houses in the area. In 1921, Wulzinger and Watzinger made a plan showing the peribolos to measure some 350m by 450m.

See also
 List of Ancient Roman temples

References

Bibliography
 .
 
 
 

Buildings and structures inside the walled city of Damascus
Conversion of non-Christian religious buildings and structures into churches
Temples of Jupiter
Persecution of pagans in the late Roman Empire
1st-century religious buildings and structures